Leedmees is a puzzle game by Konami exclusively for Xbox 360 and requires Kinect. It is available for download via Xbox Live Arcade. It was launched on September 7, 2011.

Gameplay
Players use their body to control an on-screen character to guide small creatures into a safety zone. It is designed for 1 or 2 players. There are 50 single player levels and 12 co-op levels.

Reception

Leedmees received mixed reviews from critics upon release. On Metacritic, the game holds a score of 60/100 based on 10 reviews, indicating "mixed or average reviews".

References

External links

2011 video games
Kinect games
Konami games
Puzzle video games
Xbox 360-only games
Xbox 360 games
Xbox 360 Live Arcade games
Video games developed in Japan